Erkeshtam, also Irkeshtam or Erkech-Tam, is a border crossing between Kyrgyzstan and Xinjiang, China, named after a village on the Kyrgyz side of the border in southern Osh Region. The border crossing is also called Simuhana (斯姆哈纳), after the first settlement on the Chinese side of the border, but Erkeshtam is now the more common name used in both countries.

Erkeshtam is the westernmost border crossing in China.

Location

The crossing straddles the Erkeshtam Pass, a deep gorge where the southern flank of the Tian Shan meets the Pamir Mountains. Simuhana belongs to Ulugqat County, under the Kizilsu Kirghiz Autonomous Prefecture of Xinjiang. 

The Erkeshtam Border Crossing controls the main trade routes between the Tarim Basin to the east, and the Alay and Ferghana Valleys to the west and north. On the Kyrgyz side of the border, the A371 road (now EM-05) goes west first over the Erkeshtam Pass (3,005 m) and than went over the old Taukmurun Pass (3,536 m) or now the New Silk Road Pass (3,760 m) into the Alay Valley. At Sary-Tash, the A371 (now EM-05) meets the M41 highway, which leads north through the Taldyk Pass (elevation  to Osh and the Ferghana Valley. On the Chinese side of the border, the G3013 Kashgar–Irkeshtam Expressway runs east to Kashgar and the Tarim Basin via Ulugqat. From the border till Kansu the road is labeled G581 and connects in Ulugqat to the G30, with 4,243 km Chinas longest expressway up to the pacific ocean.

Asian Highway AH65, which runs from Termez, Uzbekistan to Kashgar, China, passes through Erkeshtam. The European route E60, originating from Brest, France, ends at Erkeshtam.

On Mondays and Tuesdays, a bus runs through the pass.

History
Erkeshtam, being located at the natural dividing line between major geographic and cultural regions, has been an important border control point for several millennia. It was known during the Han Dynasty and the Three Kingdoms era (2nd third of the 3rd century CE) as Juandu. According to the Book of Han, Juandu contained "380 households, 1,100 individuals and 500 persons able to bear arms" and the inhabitants were originally of the Sai race, who wore the clothing of the Wusun and followed "the water and pastures" and kept close to the "Ts'ung-ling" (Pamir Mountains).

Erkeshtam is thought to be the Hormeterium (merchants' station) by historians which Ptolemy writes about in his treatise Geography. Some researchers have gone further to suggest it is one of multiple possible locations which he refers to as the Stone Tower. Ptolemy specifically stated that the Hormeterium lay 5 degrees further east. The passage in the Geography where Ptolemy gives the coordinates for the Stone Tower is given below (it was under the control of Sai or Sakai people, and the Komedai referred to is probably the Alai Valley):

In the territory of the Sakai there rises the already mentioned mountain region of the Komedai – the ascent to this mountain region of Sogdiana lies at 125° / 43°, the position of its terminal point near the ravine of the Komedai is at 130° / 39°; the so-called Stone Tower lies at 135° / 43°.

After Tsarist Russia took control of Central Asia, the horse path from Osh to Erkestam was developed in 1893.

In 1934, Khoja Niyaz, the titular leader of the First East Turkestan Republic (ETR) was driven out Kashgar by the Hui warlord Ma Zhongying and retreated via Erkeshtam, where he signed an agreement that dissolved the ETR and pledged support for Sheng Shicai's Soviet-backed government in Xinjiang. Ma Zhongying also left Xinjiang for the Soviet Union via Erkeshtam.

Modern border crossing
During Soviet times, the border post was named in honor of Andrei Bescennov, a frontier guard, who was killed in a clash with the Basmachi rebels in 1931. Before 1952, Erkeshtam was a trading port between China and the Soviet Union. For decades , the Erkeshtam Border Crossing was closed due to poor relations between the Soviet Union and China. On July 21, 1997, the border crossing was open on a temporary basis. On January 26, 1998, the border crossing was officially open. Russian troops were stationed at the post until 1999.

On May 20, 2002, Erkeshtam Port was officially opened. In 2002, the border post processed 8,071 travelers, 7,066 vehicles and 76,000 tons of cargo. In 2008, Erkeshtam processed 58,900 travelers and 520,000 tons of cargo. In December 2011, the customs office on the Chinese side of the border was relocated to a larger facility about 100 km to the east, outside the town of Ulugqat, which is about 1,000 m lower in elevation. In the first eleven months of 2013, 39,045 travelers, 32,554 vehicles and 464,00 tons of goods passed through the Erkeshtam Border Crossing, which ranked fourth among border crossings in Xinjiang by the tonnage of goods processed.

See also
 China–Kyrgyzstan border
 Jigin, westernmost township of China; near Erkeshtam

Notes

Footnotes

References
 
Hill, John E. 2004. The Peoples of the West from the Weilüe 魏略 by Yu Huan 魚豢: A Third Century Chinese Account Composed between 239 and 265 CE. Draft annotated English translation. Weilue: The Peoples of the West
 Hill, John E. (2015) Through the Jade Gate - China to Rome: A Study of the Silk Routes during the Later Han Dynasty, 1st to 2nd Centuries CE. Volumes I & II. John E. Hill. CreateSpace, Charleston, South Carolina. Volume I: ; Volume II: .
 Hulsewé, A. F. P. and Loewe, M. A. N. 1979. China in Central Asia: The Early Stage 125 BC – AD 23: an annotated translation of chapters 61 and 96 of the History of the Former Han Dynasty. E. J. Brill, Leiden.
 Ronca, Italo. Ptolemaios. Geographie 6,9-21. Ostiran und Zentralasien. Teil I. Containing Greek and Latin texts. Translated and annotated in German with English translation by Italo Ronca. Instituto Italiano per il medio ed estremo Oriente. Rome 1971.

External links 
 
 Satellite map at Maplandia.com
 Irkeshtam Pass

Sites along the Silk Road
Populated places in Osh Region
Mountain passes of Xinjiang
Mountain passes of Kyrgyzstan
China–Kyrgyzstan border crossings